Ritchie may refer to:

People

Surname
Adele Ritchie (1874–1930), singer – comic opera, musical comedy and vaudeville
Albert Ritchie (1876–1936), governor of Maryland 1920 to 1935
Alistair Ferguson Ritchie (1890–1954), crossword compiler under the pseudonym Afrit
Allison Ritchie (born 1974), Australian politician
Andrew Jackson Ritchie (1868–1948), president of Rabun Gap-Nacoochee School
Andy Ritchie (English footballer) (born 1960), English footballer
Andy Ritchie (Scottish footballer) (born 1956), Scottish footballer
Archibald Alexander Ritchie (1806–1856), American ship captain, China trader, and California businessman.
Brett Ritchie (born 1993), Canadian ice hockey player
Brian Ritchie (born 1960), guitarist for Violent Femmes band
Bruce Ritchie (born 1965), British property developer
Byron Ritchie (born 1977), Canadian ice hockey player
Cedric Ritchie (1927–2016), Canadian businessman
Charles Ritchie (diplomat) (1906–1995), Canadian diplomat
Charles Thomson Ritchie (1838–1906), 1st Baron Ritchie of Dundee PC
Chris Ritchie (born 1949), Royal Australian Navy vice admiral
Clint Ritchie (1938–2009), American actor
Darren Ritchie (born 1975), Scottish long jumper
David Ritchie (disambiguation), a list of people named David or Dave Ritchie
Dennis Ritchie (1941–2011), American computer scientist
Donald A. Ritchie (born 1945), historian of the United States Senate
Edgar Ritchie (1916–2002), Canadian diplomat
Edgar Ritchie (engineer) (1871–1956), hydraulic engineer in Melbourne, Australia
Edward Samuel Ritchie (1814–1895), American inventor and physicist
Fiona Ritchie (born 1960), radio broadcaster
George Ritchie (politician) (1864–1944), South Australian politician
George G. Ritchie (1923–2007), American doctor
George Gavin Ritchie, New York abolitionist
George Stephen Ritchie (1914–2012), naval officer and Hydrographer of the Navy
Gordon Ritchie (1918–1998), Canadian surgeon and politician
Grant Ritchie (actor)
Greg Ritchie (born 1960), Australian cricketer
Gregg Ritchie (born 1964), American baseball player and coach
Guy Ritchie (born 1968), British filmmaker
Harry Ritchie (born 1958), journalist
Harry Ritchie (footballer) (1898–1941), Scottish footballer
Henry Ritchie (1876–1958), British Navy officer
Ian Ritchie (architect) (born 1947), British architect
Ian Ritchie (entrepreneur), Scottish businessman
Ian Ritchie (producer), composer and musician
Innes Ritchie (born 1973), Scottish footballer
Jack Ritchie (1922–1983), pen name of John George Reitci, American novelist
James Ritchie (naturalist) (1882–1958), President of the Royal Society of Edinburgh
James Ewing Ritchie (1820–1898), English writer and journalist
Jean Ritchie (1922–2015), American folk singer and songwriter
Jill Ritchie (born 1974), American actress
John Ritchie (disambiguation)
Jon Ritchie (born 1974), American football player
Joseph Ritchie (c. 1788–1819), English surgeon, explorer and naturalist
Joseph C. Ritchie, mayor of Newport News, Virginia (1976–1986)
Josiah Ritchie (1870–1955), British tennis player 
June Ritchie (born 1938), English actress
Kate Ritchie (born 1978), Australian actress
Ken Ritchie (born 1946), British psephologist
Larry Ritchie, jazz drummer (1950s–1960s)
Leitch Ritchie (1800–1865), Scottish novelist and journalist
Margaret Ritchie (politician) (born 1958), Northern Irish politician
Mark Ritchie (politician) (born 1951), Minnesota Secretary of State
Michael Ritchie (artistic director) (born 1957), artistic director of Center Theatre Group
Michael Ritchie (film director) (1938–2001), American film director
Neil Ritchie (1897–1983), British general
Nick Ritchie (born 1995), Canadian ice hockey player
Oscar W. Ritchie (1909–1967), African American educator and sociologist
Paul Ritchie (footballer, born 1969) (born 1969), Scottish football player (East Fife)
Paul Ritchie (footballer, born 1975) (born 1975), Scottish football player (Heart of Midlothian, Dundee United)
Phil Ritchie (born 1979), American lead singer of the band Lennex
Raleigh Ritchie (Jacob Basil Anderson, born 1990) English actor, singer-songwriter, rapper, and record producer
Ray Ritchie (1936–2015), Australian rugby footballer and coach
Richmond Ritchie (1854–1912), Indian-born British civil servant
Kid Rock (born Robert James Ritchie, 1971), American rapper and singer-songwriter
Roland Ritchie (1910–1988), Justice of the Supreme Court of Canada
R. Stephen Ritchie (born 1942), American Air Force General
Scot Ritchie,  Canadian author and illustrator
Stanley Ritchie, professor at Jacobs School of Music, Indiana University
Steven Ritchie (born 1950), pinball and video game designer
Steve Ritchie (footballer) (born 1954), Scottish football player
Thomas Ritchie (disambiguation)
Todd Ritchie (born 1971), baseball player
Tommy Ritchie (born 1930), Northern Irish footballer
Walter Potter Ritchie (1892–1965), Scottish member of the British Army in World War I
William Ritchie (disambiguation)

Given name
Ritchie Blackmore (born 1945), English guitarist, founding member of hard rock bands Deep Purple and Rainbow
Ritchie Torres (born 1988), New York politician
Ritchie Valens (1941–1959), American singer, songwriter and guitarist

Fictional characters
Ritchie, a character in the 1986 American science fiction movie Howard the Duck
Ritchie Tozer, on the TV series It's a Sin (TV series)
Robert Ritchie (The West Wing), on the TV show The West Wing

Other
Ritchie Bros. Auctioneers
Baron Ritchie of Dundee

Places
Ritchie's Archipelago, Andaman Islands
Ritchie County, West Virginia, United States
Ritchie, Edmonton, Alberta, Canada
Ritchie, Indiana, an unincorporated community 
Ritchie, Kentucky, an unincorporated community 
Fort Ritchie, Maryland, United States
Ritchie, Northern Cape, South Africa

See also
Richie (film), 2017 Indian film
Richie (name), given name and surname
Richard, given name

English-language surnames